Joachim Rønning (born 30 May 1972) is a Norwegian film director who previously worked in a partnership with Espen Sandberg, both of whom came from Sandefjord, Norway. As a directing team, they went under the name of Roenberg (a portmanteau of their surnames). They co-own one of Scandinavia's largest production companies for commercials called Motion Blur. Rønning now develops and directs film and television as a solo director.

Joachim married Amanda Hearst on August 2, 2019.

Career
In 2006, Rønning and Espen Sandberg directed their feature film debut, Bandidas, starring Penélope Cruz and Salma Hayek. The film was released worldwide through EuropaCorp and Twentieth Century Fox. The film was written and produced by French filmmaker Luc Besson.

His 2012 film Kon-Tiki is the first Norwegian film to be nominated for a Golden Globe, and a Best Foreign Language Oscar at the 85th Academy Awards. The duo directed the fifth Pirates of the Caribbean film, Pirates of the Caribbean: Dead Men Tell No Tales (2017).

In October 2017, it was announced Rønning would direct Maleficent: Mistress of Evil from a screenplay written by Linda Woolverton and Jez Butterworth, with Angelina Jolie reprising the role as the titular character. The film was released in 2019.

Announced projects

In 2016, Rønning directed the pilot for a new ABC thriller drama series titled Doomsday starring Rochelle Aytes and produced by Carol Mendelsohn and Sony TV.

In 2017, it was announced that Paramount had bought an original project entitled Origin that will be directed by Rønning and was written by Rønning and his brother, Andreas Rønning. The film will be produced by Jerry Bruckheimer. Rønning is also set to direct an adaptation of the last Michael Crichton novel, Micro, for Amblin Entertainment to be distributed by Universal and produced by Frank Marshall.

Filmography
Co-directed with Espen Sandberg

Solo works

References

External links
 

Living people
Norwegian expatriates in Australia
Norwegian film directors
People from Sandefjord
1979 births